Dectodesis monticola is a species of tephritid or fruit flies in the genus Dectodesis of the family Tephritidae.

Distribution
Uganda, Kenya.

References

Tephritinae
Insects described in 1957
Diptera of Africa